PS-103 Karachi East-V is a constituency of the Provincial Assembly of Sindh.

General elections 2013

General elections 2008

See also
 PS-103 Karachi East-V
 PS-105 Karachi East-VII

References

Constituencies of Sindh